Jonathan Patrick Moynihan OBE (born 21 June 1948) is a British businessman and venture capitalist, who served as the CEO and executive chairman of PA Consulting Group.

Early life
Moynihan was born on 21 June 1948 in Cambridge, Cambridgeshire, England to Sir Noel Henry and Margaret Mary Moynihan (née Lovelace). He has one brother and two sisters. His father was a general practitioner and a former president of the charity, Save the Children. Moynihan was privately educated at Ratcliffe College in Leicester, and then studied at Balliol College, Oxford, in 1967. He is a foundation fellow of the college. He worked for Track Records and then the charities War on Want and Save the Children in India and Bangladesh. Between 1972 and 1976, Moynihan worked at the healthcare company Roche Products. He has additional Masters degrees from North London Polytechnic, and Massachusetts Institute of Technology.

Career
His first consulting job was at McKinsey & Company in 1977 in Amsterdam. He left the company to join Strategic Planning Associates in Washington in 1979. Moynihan then founded his own company, Moynihan Strategy Consultants, later merging it with First Manhattan Consulting Group. In 1992, he was appointed as CEO of the consultancy PA Consulting Group, and later chairman. At the time of his appointment, PA was "effectively bankrupt".

At the company, he transitioned the ownership of the firm from a trust to an employee-owned model. Moynihan wrote a charter of ethics that was mandatory for employees to sign up to. He was credited for turning around the company in the 1990s. Moynihan retired at the end of 2013 as chairman, having run PA for some 22 years, but remained as Chairman and a principal of its venture capital arm, Ipex Capital. In 2015, American private equity firm The Carlyle Group obtained a 51% share in the company, valuing PA at $1 Billion. In 2020, PA was re-sold to Jacob's Engineering at a value of $2.5 Billion.

From 1995 on, he founded, chaired and brought to success numerous startup companies. As a journalist/author, Moynihan has been published extensively on topics such as trade, economics, health and football.

Political activities

Euroscepticism and Brexit
Moynihan supports Brexit. Prior to the 2016 referendum, he was a member of the eurosceptic campaign group Business for Britain and sat on its board. While at Business for Britain, he was chairman of the editorial board, and came up with the name for Business for Britain's influential 1,000+ page argument for Brexit, "Change, or Go". He was the chairman first, of the campaign committee; then of the finance committee, and a member of the board of the official pro-Brexit campaign organisation, Vote Leave and was their final Chairman.  Moynihan is the chairman of the pro-Brexit right-wing think tank Initiative for Free Trade.

Support for Liz Truss
Moynihan was the Chairman of the Liz Truss leadership campaign in 2022, which led to her becoming prime minister in September 2022. 

He was against the view that a budget could not be produced without an accompanying OBR commentary. His view was that "This whole idea that you have to get the tick of approval from the OBR, which has been consistently wrong in its financial forecasts is, in my view, anti-democratic."

This omission was said to be one of the causes of the failure of Truss's and Kwarteng's budget on 23 September 2022, which attempted to rip up decades of treasury orthodoxy.  In an influential commentary Moynihan evidenced that the prime cause of market disruption at the time was the Bank of England's bungling.

Other
In June 2019, he donated £100,000 to Boris Johnson during the 2019 Conservative Party leadership election.

He is chairman of the education reform campaign organisation, Parents and Teachers for Excellence.

He has campaigned for the Electoral Commission to be abolished.

Voluntary activities, and honours
He was appointed an OBE in 1995 for services to business. 
Moynihan is a foundation fellow of, and was, from 1995 to 2007, chairman of the Campaign Board at, Balliol College, which helped raise during his chairmanship £35 million for the college and the Oxford Internet Institute. 
In 2010, he received a Distinguished Friends of Oxford award.  
Moynihan is a fellow of Gray's Inn. 
He served as the president of the Royal Albert Hall from 2015 to 2019. 
He co-founded, with Helen Bamber OBE, and was the founding chairman, of the Helen Bamber Foundation. 
He created a proposal for the Brompton and Marsden Hospitals to merge with other health organisations on the Chelsea Medical campus site.

In 2021, Moynihan was named as one of UK's "Top 75 Catholic leaders".

He is a director of the IEA Forum, the non-charitable arm of the Institute of Economic Affairs. He is on the Advisory Council of the Free Speech Union.

Personal life
Moynihan is married to Patricia Underwood, the 1982 Coty Award-winning hat designer.

References

1948 births
Living people
British Eurosceptics
Conservative Party (UK) donors